Zu Yong (699–746?) was a Chinese poet of the High Tang period. His courtesy name is unknown.

He attained a jinshi degree in the imperial examination in 724, but left the capital to live a pastoral life, and composed his most famous poems on nature.

Among his better-known poems are the jueju "On Seeing the Snow Peak of Zhongnan" and the  "Rufen bie ye". Book 131 of the Quan Tangshi is devoted to his poetry.

Biography 
Zu Yong was probably born around 699, but this is not certain. He hailed from Luoyang in modern-day Henan Province. He was a childhood friend of the poet Wang Wei.

In 724 he attained a jinshi degree in the imperial examination. He earned the favour of the high-ranking statesman Zhang Yue, but he did not take to life at court, and in his later years retired to his villa in Rufen (modern-day Fuyang, Anhui Province).

His courtesy name is not known.

Poetry 
Zu Yong occupies a prominent position as a nature poet of the High Tang period. In addition to writing about natural scenery, his poems sing the praises of life in seclusion. Thirty-six of his poems survive, and two of his poems were included in the Three Hundred Tang Poems.

He was a close friend of the poet Wang Wei and also an associate of Wang Han.

One of his most famous poems is the  "Rufen bie ye", which is considered the representative poem of his post-retirement period.

The first half of the poem bemoans the solitude and loneliness of the poet's life of farming after leaving court, and then the latter half is filled with love for the new environment in which the poet finds himself.

Another of his best-regarded works is the jueju "On Seeing the Snow Peak of Zhongnan".

There exists a Ming-era compilation called the Zu Yong Ji.

Notes

References

Cited works

External links 
Book 131 of the Quan Tangshi (which collects Zu Yong's poems) in the Chinese Text Project

699 births
746 deaths
8th-century Chinese poets
Poets from Henan
Three Hundred Tang Poems poets
Writers from Luoyang